Egle or EGLE may refer to:

 Eglė, a Lithuanian feminine given name
 Egle (fly), a genus in the family Anthomyiidae
 Eglė the Queen of Serpents, a Lithuanian folktale
 Every Ghanaian Living Everywhere, a political party in Ghana
 Michigan Department of Environment, Great Lakes, and Energy

People with the surname
 Juergen Egle, Austrian para-alpine skier
 Madeleine Egle (born 1988), Australian luger

See also
 
 Eagle (disambiguation)